Korean Air Force may refer to:

 Korean People's Army Air Force, Air Force of North Korea
 Republic of Korea Air Force, Air Force of South Korea